Teeth of Lions Rule the Divine is an English drone doom supergroup, formed in 2001 with musicians from other metal bands.

The name is taken from the second song from the Earth album Earth 2. The music is slow and heavy, similar to the music of Khanate and Burning Witch.

Band members
Lee Dorrian – vocals (Cathedral, Napalm Death)
Stephen O'Malley – guitar (Khanate, Sunn O))), Burning Witch, Thorr's Hammer)
Greg Anderson – bass guitar, organ (Goatsnake, Sunn O))), Burning Witch, Thorr's Hammer)
Justin Greaves – drums (Iron Monkey, Electric Wizard, Crippled Black Phoenix)

Discography
Rampton - 2002 (Southern Lord Records/Rise Above Records)

External links
 Southern Lord web page
Metal Archives

English doom metal musical groups
Musical groups established in 2001
Musical quartets
Drone metal musical groups